Loyola University Chicago School of Law is the law school of Loyola University Chicago, in Illinois.  Established in 1909, by the Society of Jesus, the Roman Catholic order of the Jesuits, the School of Law is located in downtown Chicago.  Loyola University Chicago School of Law offers degrees and combined degree programs, including the Doctor of Juridical Science (S.J.D.).

The Fall 2022 entering class had a median GPA of 3.49 and a median LSAT of 159. More than a quarter of the 2019 entering class were students of color. The July 2018 Illinois Bar Exam pass rate for first-time test takers was 85%.  Loyola's 2022 U.S. News ranking national ranking was 73rd, and 9th for its part-time programs out of 69 ranked schools. Loyola has been highly ranked in health law (3rd nationally in 2022) and family law. In 2017, Loyola was ranked 6th in the country in health law and 6th in trial advocacy according to U.S. News' 2017 specialty rankings. In 2015, Loyola was ranked #1 in the country in family law according to Law Street Media. Law Street Media ranked Loyola's healthcare law and business law programs #1 and #9 in the country, respectively, in 2014.
Loyola recently launched a weekend JD program to provide a flexible option for working professionals.

According to Loyola's 2019 ABA-required disclosures, 73% of the Class of 2019 obtained full-time, long-term, bar passage required employment ten months after graduation.

Academics
There are fourteen major degree programs offered at the School of Law: doctor of jurisprudence (J.D.), master of laws (LL.M.) in either business law, child and family law, health law or tax law. Specialized certificates are available in advocacy, child and family law, health law, international law and practice, public interest law, tax law, and transactional law. Students may pursue a master of jurisprudence (M.J.) in either business and compliance law, child and family law, health law, global competition, and rule of law for development.  There are two major doctoral degrees: doctor of juridical sciences in health law and policy (S.J.D.) which is the highest degree any attorney may obtain in the United States and the doctor of laws (D.Law).  Dual degree programs are offered with the Loyola University Chicago School of Social Work (J.D./M.S.W. and M.J./M.S.W.), Department of Political Science (J.D./M.A.), Graduate School of Education (J.D./M.A. in International Comparative Law and Education) and the Graduate School of Business (J.D./M.B.A.). Loyola offers a master of laws and master of jurisprudence in rule of law for development at the University's John Felice Rome Center in Italy. Loyola offers seven online degree programs and online certificate programs in school discipline reform and privacy law. Additionally, Loyola Chicago Law is known for a significant orientation in public interest and social justice. The school's Curt and Linda Rodin Center for Social Justice Fellowship is widely recognized as one of the most prestigious public interest and social justice fellowships of its kind.

Like most U.S. law schools, Loyola imposes a grade curve to maintain a median GPA of 3.0.

Employment 

According to the ABA-required disclosure of Employment Summary for 2019 Loyola University Chicago School of Law graduates, 73.0% of the Class of 2019 obtained "bar passage required" employment within ten months of graduation.  A “bar passage required” position is defined as one that requires the graduate to pass a bar exam and to be licensed to practice law in one or more jurisdictions. The positions that have such a requirement are varied and include, for example, positions in law firms, business, or government. However, not all positions in law firms, business, or government require bar passage; for example, a paralegal position would not. Positions that require the graduate to pass a bar exam and be licensed after beginning employment in order to retain the position are included in this category. Judicial clerkships are also included in this category.

An additional 13.7% of the Class of 2019 obtained "J.D. advantaged" employment within ten months of graduation.  A “J.D. advantaged” position is one for which the employer sought an individual with a J.D., and perhaps even required a J.D., or for which the J.D. provided a demonstrable advantage in obtaining or performing the job, but which does not itself require bar passage or an active law license or involve practicing law. Examples of positions for which a J.D. is an advantage include a corporate contracts administrator, alternative dispute resolution specialist, government regulatory analyst, FBI agent, and accountant. Also included might be jobs in personnel or human resources, jobs with investment banks, jobs with consulting firms, jobs doing compliance work in business and industry, jobs in law firm professional development, and jobs in law school career services offices, admissions offices, or other law school administrative offices. Doctors or nurses who plan to work in a litigation, insurance, or risk management setting, or as expert witnesses, would fall into this category, as would journalists and teachers (in a higher education setting) of law and law related topics. It is an indicator that a position does not fall into this category if a J.D. is uncommon among persons holding such a position.

Bar passage 
According to the ABA-required disclosure of Bar Passage Results for 2020, in calendar year 2019 the Loyola University Chicago School of Law had a total of 198 graduates.  The school had a total of 184 graduates who sat for their first bar examination within any jurisdiction.  Out of those who sat for their first bar examination in calendar year 2019, a total of 157, or 85.3%, passed on their first attempt.

Costs
The total cost of attendance (including the cost of tuition, fees, and living expenses) in the full-time JD Program for the 2017–2018 academic year is $70,224.

The total cost of attendance (including the cost of tuition, fees, and living expenses) in the part-time, Weekend JD Program for the 2017–2018 academic year is $59,922.

Student body
The School of Law currently occupies the Corboy Law Center at 25 East Pearson Street.  The Law School previously occupied Maguire Hall, at One East Pearson, but switched buildings with the Loyola University Chicago Quinlan School of Business in the fall of 2005.  Each day, its student body of over 1,000 congregates at the Water Tower Campus to receive instruction from full-time and part-time professors. Students are involved in over thirty student organizations and six distinguished law publications: Annals of Health Law, Children's Legal Rights Journal, Loyola Consumer Law Review, International Law Review, Loyola University Chicago Law Journal, Public Interest Law Reporter and Loyola University Chicago Journal of Regulatory Compliance.

Administration
Michèle Alexandre is dean of the Law School, as of July, 2022. She is the 14th dean of the Law School, and previously was Dean at Stetson University College of Law from 2019–2022. Alexandre chose to take the position at Loyala University Chicago because of the School of Law's focus on the public interest, noting that "[i]t’s very rare to have a law school that is not ambivalent about service." She is a first-generation lawyer and was raised in Haiti and Brooklyn, New York.

From July 2005 until May 2016, David N. Yellen served as Dean and Professor of Law.  Professor of Law and Associate Dean of Academic Affairs Michael J. Kaufman assumed the role of interim dean after Yellen left Loyola to become president of Marist College. After an extensive national search, Kaufman was appointed Loyola University Chicago's 12th law dean. Kaufman has been a member of Loyola's full-time law faculty since 1986. His areas of expertise are education law and policy, securities regulation and litigation, civil procedure, and jurisprudence.

The Thomas Tang moot court competition
In 1993, the APA Law Student Association of the South Texas College of Law founded the Thomas Tang National Moot Court Competition. The competition is administered by the National Asian Pacific American Bar Association ("NAPABA") Law Foundation and the NAPABA Judicial Council. Judge Thomas Tang was a champion of individual rights, an advocate for the advancement of minority attorneys and an ardent supporter of NAPABA and the moot court competition. This moot court competition was established to continue Judge Tang's legacy.  From 1977 until his death in 1995, he served on the United States Ninth Circuit Court of Appeals.

The format of the competition divides the country into six regions: central, northeast, southeast, southwest, west, and northwest.  The top two teams from each region advance to the national competition that is held simultaneously with the NAPABA National Convention.  The convention sites have included, but are not limited to Hawaii, New York City, Scottsdale, Arizona, Washington D.C., Los Angeles, California, Atlanta, Georgia, Dallas, Texas, and Las Vegas, Nevada.

In 2017 and 2018, Loyola won both the regional and national Thomas Tang Moot Court Competition.

Notable alumni
Peg McDonnell Breslin, member of the Illinois House of Representatives from 1977–1991 and the first woman elected (outside of Cook County) to the Illinois Appellate Court
James Milton Burns, United States Federal Judge, United States District Court for the District of Oregon
Joseph Carroll, founding director of the Defense Intelligence Agency (DIA), and founding director of the Air Force Office of Special Investigations (AFOSI)
David H. Coar, United States Federal Judge, United States District Court for the Northern District of Illinois
Suzanne B. Conlon, United States Federal Judge, United States District Court for the Northern District of Illinois
Philip H. Corboy Sr., personal injury and aviation litigation attorney, named in The National Law Journal's Profiles in Power and The Best Lawyers in America
A. L. Cronin, Illinois state legislator and lawyer 
John Darrah, United States Federal Judge, United States District Court for the Northern District of Illinois
Tom Dart (1987), Sheriff of Cook County, Illinois
Joyce Karlin Fahey, former federal prosecutor, Los Angeles County Superior Court judge, and two-term mayor of Manhattan Beach, California
John Phil Gilbert, United States Federal Judge, United States District Court for the Southern District of Illinois
John Harris, Rod Blagojevich Chief of Staff
William Thomas Hart, United States Federal Judge, United States District Court for the Northern District of Illinois
Neil Hartigan, former Illinois Attorney General, Lieutenant Governor, and a judge of the Illinois Appellate Court
Donald L. Hollowell, civil rights attorney instrumental in winning the desegregation of the University of Georgia in 1961
Henry Hyde, U.S. Congressman (1975–2007)
Daniel Hynes, former Comptroller of Illinois, 2010 candidate for Governor of Illinois
Virginia Mary Kendall, United States Federal Judge, United States District Court for the Northern District of Illinois
Louis A. Lehr, Jr., of Arnstein & Lehr, LLP, civil defense litigation attorney who has represented major corporations in 44 states, Puerto Rico and Mexico
Lisa Madigan, former Attorney General of Illinois
Michael Madigan, former Speaker of the Illinois House of Representatives and former Chairman of the Democratic Party of Illinois
Howard Thomas Markey, first chief judge of the United States Court of Appeals for the Federal Circuit
Frank James McGarr, former United States Federal Judge, United States District Court for the Northern District of Illinois
Mary Ann G. McMorrow, former chief justice, Supreme Court of Illinois
Dan Proft, political writer, radio talk show host and 2010 Illinois gubernatorial candidate.
Michael Quigley, U.S. Congressman from Illinois' 5th District
William Quinlan, former Illinois state appellate court justice, former Chicago Corporation Counsel, and former parliamentarian for the Cook County Board of Commissioners
Elizabeth Rochford, lawyer from Illinois who serves an associate judge of Illinois' 19th Judicial Circuit.
Edith S. Sampson, alternate U.S. delegate to the United Nations, member of the UN's Social, Humanitarian, and Cultural Committee, member of the U.S. Commission for UNESCO, U.S. representative to NATO, first black woman to be elected as a judge in Illinois
Thomas P. Sullivan, United States Attorney for the Northern District of Illinois
Robert R. Thomas, Chief Justice of the Supreme Court of Illinois
Dan K. Webb, Chairman & Partner, Winston & Strawn LLP
Corinne Wood, first female Lieutenant Governor of Illinois (1999–2003)

See also

References

External links
 Loyola University Chicago School of Law

 
Catholic law schools in the United States
Educational institutions established in 1908
Jesuit universities and colleges in the United States
Law schools in Illinois
Loyola University Chicago
1908 establishments in Illinois